The Eighth Doctor Adventures (sometimes abbreviated as EDA or referred to as the EDAs) are a series of spin off novels based on the long running BBC science fiction television series Doctor Who and published under the BBC Books imprint. 73 books were published overall.

Publication history
Between 1991 and 1997, Virgin Publishing had been producing a successful series of spin off novels under the New Adventures and Missing Adventures ranges. However, following the Doctor Who television movie which introduced the Eighth Doctor in 1996, the BBC did not renew Virgin Publishing's license to continue publishing Doctor Who material, instead opting to publish their own range. Virgin's last New Adventures novel, The Dying Days by Lance Parkin, featured the Eighth Doctor.

The Eighth Doctor Adventures began in 1997 with The Eight Doctors by Terrance Dicks and continued until 2005. These novels all feature the Eighth Doctor, as portrayed in the 1996 television movie by Paul McGann. It is unclear if the BBC line was originally intended to be a continuation of the continuity established in the New Adventures. However, as many of the writers for the Eighth Doctor Adventures had also written for the Virgin series, many elements from the New Adventures began to appear in both the EDAs and the Past Doctor Adventures (which replaced the Missing Adventures), and such continuity has been broadly maintained.

Virgin had distinguished the New and Missing Adventures with different cover designs. BBC Books, however, did not differentiate their novels featuring the current and past Doctors in this way, although they were listed separately within the books. Fans continued to distinguish the ongoing story of the Eighth Doctor from the more stand-alone adventures of past Doctors, although some plot elements did cross over both ranges.

With the revival of the television series, BBC Books ceased the regular Eighth Doctor Adventures in favour of a new range (the New Series Adventures), featuring characters from the new series. One further novel featuring the Eighth Doctor (Fear Itself) was published under the Past Doctor Adventures line before it too ceased publication.

In addition to the Eighth Doctor Adventures and the Past Doctor Adventures, the BBC also published three short story collections under the title of Short Trips which feature all eight (at the time of publication) Doctors. These were also inherited from Virgin, a version of their Decalog short story collections, and when the BBC ceased publishing them, a licence to continue was sought by Big Finish Productions, who published some for a while. They now continue to publish their own range of Short Trips collections as audios.

Crossover
In 2018, elements of the series were used in an officially licensed crossover story with the 10,000 Dawns series, titled White Canvas, alongside elements of Faction Paradox. This was later published in print form in the anthology, 10,000 Dawns: The Outer Universe Collection.

List of Eighth Doctor Adventures

Plot overview
Following the events of the 1996 Doctor Who television movie, the Eighth Doctor picks up a British teenager from 1997, Samantha "Sam" Jones, and later a disaffected drifter in his late twenties named Fitz Kreiner from 1963. During their adventures, the threesome tangle with the Faction Paradox, a renegade voodoo cult of time travellers who believed in creating time paradoxes and altering history. They also meet the Doctor's old friend Iris Wildthyme, a Time Lady from Gallifrey who travels in a TARDIS shaped like a London double-decker bus.

When Sam leaves the TARDIS, the Doctor and Fitz are joined by Compassion, a member of a once-human race called the Remote who slowly begins a conversion process into a living TARDIS. The Time Lords, led by his old companion Romana, now President of the High Council, anxious to get their hands on this new TARDIS technology, pursue the Doctor, who loses his own TARDIS and continues to travel using Compassion. The conflict with Faction Paradox comes to a climax on Gallifrey, where the Doctor discovers his TARDIS in orbit around the planet, transformed into a giant structure of living bone by the Faction. The Doctor, faced with an impossible decision, destroys the Faction and causes major damage to the timeline by apparently wiping his homeworld and his people from history.

Much later, it is revealed that four Time Lords had survived the catastrophe: The Doctor, the Master, Iris Wildthyme and Marnal.

Meanwhile, having rescued the Doctor from near-death, Compassion leaves the now-amnesiac Doctor on Earth in the late 19th century while she drops Fitz off in 2001 to await the long process of the Doctor's — and the now-embryonic TARDIS's — recovery. She then departs for parts unknown. The Doctor spends the next hundred years travelling the world and living through its history, eventually adopting Miranda, a young girl with two hearts. Miranda leaves the Doctor to face her own destiny in the far future, and the Doctor goes on to meet Fitz as arranged, thanks to a note Compassion slipped into his pocket a century before. Following that, the two are joined by Anji Kapoor, a London stock trader and the three leave Earth in the TARDIS.

Much later, while on Earth in the eighteenth century, the Doctor, Fitz and Anji encounter Sabbath, a Secret Service operative who is aware of time travel and becomes the Doctor's personal nemesis. The Doctor loses his second heart, which was slowly killing him as it was his only link to his now-forgotten homeworld. Sabbath takes the heart and implants it in his own body, tying him and the Doctor together. Through several more adventures, the Doctor and his companions encounter Sabbath again and Trix MacMillan stows away aboard the TARDIS.

Sabbath subsequently loses the Doctor's time-sensitive heart and the Doctor grows a new one. The Doctor also begins to recover fragments of his memory, and discovers that Sabbath is working for a group called the Council of Eight. The Council wants to collapse the alternate timelines of the multiverse into one, manageable timeline. To them, the Doctor is a rogue element that needs to be controlled or eliminated. They also begin to eliminate his previous companions from time. Trix comes out of hiding, joining the crew, and Anji leaves the TARDIS. Sabbath eventually realises that the council is not human and turns on his masters. Miranda, now a grown woman with a daughter, also returns to help her adopted father defeat the council, but both she and Sabbath die in the process.

Eventually, the Doctor returns to Earth in 2005 and discovers that another Time Lord, Marnal, has also survived the destruction of Gallifrey. Marnal, who also claims to be the original owner of the Doctor's TARDIS, blames the Doctor for the cataclysm, and takes him and the TARDIS captive while the insectoid alien Vore invade the Earth. After a cold fusion explosion guts the interior of the TARDIS, the Doctor discovers that K-9 Mark II had been aboard all along, with orders from Lady President Romana of Gallifrey to kill him. However, K-9 pauses once it scans the Doctor's mind and discovers the reason why the Doctor has lost his memory.

Just prior to destroying Gallifrey, the Doctor (with Compassion's help) downloaded the contents of the Gallifreyan Matrix — the massive computer network containing the mental traces of every Time Lord living and dead — into his brain, with his own memories suppressed to make room for the data. Gallifrey had not actually been erased from history, but an event horizon in relative time prevented anyone from Gallifrey's past to travel beyond Gallifrey's destruction, and vice versa. Both the planet and the Time Lords can be restored, along with the Doctor's memory, if a sufficiently sophisticated computer could be found to reconstruct them. Before that can be done, however, there is the problem of the Vore to contend with.

At novel's end, the Doctor, Trix and Fitz are set to confront the Vore invasion force. The restoration of Gallifrey, in time for its second destruction in the Time War prior to the events of the 2005 series has yet to be chronicled.

The Eighth Doctor Adventures line ends with The Gallifrey Chronicles. Although one further novel featuring the Eighth Doctor (Fear Itself by Nick Wallace) was published under the Past Doctor Adventures line before BBC Books decided to retire the PDAs as well, that book takes place prior to Timeless. It remains to be seen if the events of The Gallifrey Chronicles will be followed up by any future novel.

Companions
The Doctor has a series of new companions, who never appeared in the television programme. They are:
Samantha "Sam" Jones – from The Eight Doctors to Interference.
Fitzgerald Michael "Fitz" Kreiner – from The Taint to The Gallifrey Chronicles.
Compassion – Interference to The Ancestor Cell.
Miranda – Father Time and The Gallifrey Chronicles.
Anji Kapoor – Escape Velocity to Timeless.
Beatrix "Trix" MacMillan – Timeless to The Gallifrey Chronicles.

Recurring characters
Sabbath first appears in The Adventuress of Henrietta Street.
Iris Wildthyme, a Time Lady appears in The Scarlet Empress, The Blue Angel and Mad Dogs and Englishmen.
Members of Faction Paradox, a time-travelling voodoo cult founded by renegade Time Lords (no individual members of the cult appear more than once).

See also
List of Doctor Who novelists

Further reading

References

External links
The Doctor Who Bewildering Reference Guide – a guide to continuity references in selected Doctor Who original novels.
 – a guide to Doctor Who original novels, named and modeled after The Discontinuity Guide by Cornell, Day and Topping
The TARDIS Library's listing of BBC Eighth Doctor books

Eighth Doctor Adventures
Book series introduced in 1997